Half-Life: Alyx is a 2020 virtual reality (VR) first-person shooter game developed and published by Valve. It was released for Windows and Linux with support for most PC-compatible VR headsets. Set five years before Half-Life 2 (2004), players control Alyx Vance on a mission to seize a superweapon belonging to the alien Combine. Like previous Half-Life games, Alyx incorporates combat, puzzles, exploration and survival horror. Players use VR to interact with the environment and fight enemies, using "gravity gloves" to snatch objects from a distance, similarly to the gravity gun from Half-Life 2. 

The previous Half-Life game, Episode Two, was released in 2007 and ended on a cliffhanger. Valve made several attempts to develop further Half-Life games, but could not settle on a direction. In the mid-2010s, Valve began experimenting with VR. Recognizing the demand for a major VR game, they experimented with prototypes using their various intellectual properties such as Portal, and found Half-Life to be best suited for VR. 

Half-Life: Alyx entered production using Valve's new Source 2 engine in 2016, with the largest team in Valve's history, including members of Campo Santo, a studio Valve acquired in 2018. VR affected almost every aspect of the design, including combat, movement, level design, and pacing. Valve initially planned to launch Alyx alongside its Index VR headset in 2019, but delayed it following internal feedback about the story by their new writer, Rob Yescombe; Erik Wolpaw and Jay Pinkerton rejoined Valve to rewrite it. 

Half-Life: Alyx received acclaim for its graphics, voice acting, narrative, and atmosphere, and has been cited as VR's first killer app. It was nominated for numerous awards and won "Best VR/AR" at the 2020 Game Awards. Valve acknowledged that the audience for VR games was limited; Gabe Newell, the president of Valve, described Alyx as a long-term investment into new technologies.

Gameplay 
Half-Life: Alyx is a virtual reality game (VR) that supports all SteamVR-compatible VR headsets, which include the Valve Index, HTC Vive, Oculus Rift, Oculus Quest and all Windows Mixed Reality headsets. As the gameplay was designed for VR, Valve said they had no plans for a non-VR version. Half-Life: Alyx also supports user mods via the Steam Workshop.

Players control the Resistance member Alyx Vance as she and her father Eli Vance fight the Combine, an alien empire that has conquered Earth. The designer David Speyrer said Alyx was not an episodic game or side story, but "the next part of the Half-Life story", around the same length as Half-Life 2. Players use VR to get supplies, use interfaces, throw objects, and engage in combat. Like the gravity gun from Half-Life 2, the gravity gloves allow players to pick up objects from a distance. The game includes traditional Half-Life elements such as exploration, puzzles, combat, and story. While it is primarily a first-person shooter, it adds elements of the survival horror genre, as health and ammo are more scarce, and includes frightening encounters.

Players can physically move around in room scale to move Alyx in-game. Alternatively, they can use analog sticks on the VR controllers to move Alyx as in a traditional game, teleport to nearby points, or use an intermediate mode to "glide" to selected points. When players teleport, the game simulates movement even though the action is instantaneous. Alyx may die if attacked or moved from too great a height.

Plot
Half-Life: Alyx takes place five years before the events of Half-Life 2. Earth has been conquered by the alien Combine, who have implemented a brutal police state. In City 17, teenage Alyx and her father Dr. Eli Vance, both members of a human resistance movement, are stealing Combine resources. After they are captured by the Combine, resistance member Russell rescues Alyx and warns her that Eli will be transported to Nova Prospekt for interrogation. To intercept the train carrying Eli, Alyx ventures into the quarantine zone, an area inside City 17 infested with parasitic alien life. Along the way, she meets an eccentric Vortigaunt named Gary who asks Alyx to save his fellow Vortigaunts and foresees that Eli will die.

Inside the Quarantine Zone, Alyx derails the train and Gary rescues Eli from the wreckage. While in custody, Eli has learned that the Combine are storing a superweapon in a massive vault that hovers above the quarantine zone; he instructs Alyx to find the vault and steal its contents. Alyx ventures through the Quarantine Zone, contending with aliens and Combine soldiers. She shuts down a power station keeping the vault afloat, and discovers that each station contains enslaved Vortigaunts forced to channel their energies to the vault. The Vortigaunt she rescues promises that he and the others will take down the remaining power stations.

Eli contacts Alyx and warns her that the vault does not contain a weapon; it is a prison built around an apartment complex to contain something the Combine discovered. Alyx, Eli and Russell reason that whatever is inside can help them fight the Combine. As she approaches the vault, Alyx overhears a scientist mentioning to Combine superiors that the occupant is a survivor of the Black Mesa incident. Assuming the survivor is Gordon Freeman, Alyx aims to mount a rescue and crashes the vault to the ground.

Inside the vault, Alyx finds the apartment complex around which it was built. Anomalous physical phenomena permeate the building; objects float in antigravity, and mirrored rooms are stacked on top of one another. Alyx discovers an advanced prison cell in its center. She breaks it open, expecting to find Gordon, but instead releases the mysterious G-Man. As a reward, the G-Man offers his services to Alyx. She requests he remove the Combine from Earth, but the G-Man claims that the interests of his other "employers" are too strong to justify such a significant change. He instead transfers her to the future, and offers her the chance to change the outcome of Eli's death at the hands of a Combine Advisor at the end of Half-Life 2: Episode Two. Alyx complies, killing the Advisor and saving her father. The G-Man informs Alyx that she has proven herself capable of replacing Gordon, with whom the G-Man has grown dissatisfied. He traps Alyx in stasis and leaves.

Gordon regains consciousness in White Forest base. Eli is alive, but Alyx is missing. Eli realizes what has happened to Alyx, declares his intention to kill the G-Man, and hands Gordon his crowbar.

Development

Background 

After the release of Half-Life 2 in 2004, Valve began developing a trilogy of episodic sequels, planning to release shorter games more frequently. Half-Life 2: Episode One was released in 2006, followed by Episode Two in 2007, which ended on a cliffhanger. Episode Three was scheduled for 2008, but was canceled. The designer Robin Walker said that Valve used the Half-Life series to "solve some interesting collision of technology and art that had reared itself"; when working on Episode Three, Valve failed to find a unifying idea that provided a sense of "wonderment, or opening, or expansion". 

Valve abandoned episodic development and made several failed attempts to develop further Half-Life projects. Walker blamed the lack of progress on Valve's flat management structure, whereby employees decide what to work on themselves. He said the team eventually decided that "we would all be happier if we worked on a big thing, even if it’s not exactly what we wanted to work on".

Valve decided to complete its new engine, Source 2, before beginning a new game, as developing Half-Life 2 and the original Source engine simultaneously had created problems. In 2016 and 2017, the Half-Life writers Marc Laidlaw, Erik Wolpaw, Jay Pinkerton and Chet Faliszek left Valve; coupled with Valve's support for their other franchises, journalists took the departures as an indicator that new Half-Life games were no longer in development.

In 2015, Valve collaborated with the electronics company HTC to develop the HTC Vive, a virtual reality headset released in 2016. Valve's president, Gabe Newell, aimed for Valve to become more like Nintendo, which develops games in tandem with hardware and allows them to create innovative games such as Super Mario 64. Valve experimented with VR, and in 2016 released The Lab, a collection of VR minigames. Valve recognized that many players wanted a more ambitious VR AAA game. Walker wondered if they could develop a VR "killer app", as the influential FPS Doom had been in 1993.

Production 
Valve developed several VR prototypes, with three projects under development by 2017. Finding that the portal systems of their puzzle series Portal were disorienting in VR, they settled on Half-Life. Walker said that Half-Life 3 had been a "terrifyingly daunting prospect", and the team saw VR as a way to return to the series. Additionally, Valve anticipated that fans would react negatively if Half-Life 3 were a VR-only game, and felt that a prequel carried less weight.

Valve built prototypes using Half-Life 2 assets, and narrowed the gameplay systems to those they felt best fit VR. They found that the Half-Life systems were a "surprisingly natural fit" for VR, but that VR affected almost every aspect of the design, including combat, level design and pacing. For example, shooting in VR, which requires the player to physically position their hand in space, is a different experience from aiming with traditional mouse-and-keyboard controls. 

Valve did not develop a non-VR version of Alyx, as they were confident that the game would only be possible in VR. They anticipated that fans would modify it to run without VR equipment; though this bothered some on the team, Walker was not concerned, as he believed it would offer an inferior experience that would demonstrate why they had chosen VR.

Half-Life: Alyx entered development around February 2016, and entered full production later that year. The team, comprising around 80 people, was the largest in Valve's history, and included Campo Santo, a studio Valve acquired in 2018. As Valve had repeatedly failed to see projects through, some staff were reluctant to join and many were skeptical that VR was the right direction.

In late 2018, Valve held a company-wide playtest of the entire game; the results convinced the team that VR had been the right choice. The final weeks of development took place remotely due to the COVID-19 pandemic. Mike Morasky, the composer for Portal 2 and Team Fortress 2, wrote the score in consultation with Kelly Bailey, the composer for previous Half-Life games. He cited industrial music by acts such as Nine Inch Nails, the Prodigy and Skinny Puppy as inspiration.

Movement 
To mitigate the problem of motion sickness in VR, Valve implemented several movement options. They cited inspiration from the 2018 VR game Budget Cuts, which uses teleporting to move the player between locations. Valve had assumed that teleportation would damage the experience; however, though teleporting appears jarring when watching others use it, they found that players quickly became accustomed to it. According to Walker, "It recedes to the background of your mind, and you become much more focused on what you're doing with it."

To disincentivize players from quickly teleporting through levels, Valve filled areas with elements to capture their attention and slow them down, such as threats, collectables or other elements of interest. To solve the problem of taller players having to crouch when moving through some spaces, Valve standardized their virtual body size when they teleport, effectively making every player the same height when teleporting. They found that players did not notice this discrepancy as they were focused on moving to their goal.

Combat 
Every weapon can be used one-handed, as Valve wanted players to have a hand free to interact with the world at all times. The crowbar, an iconic weapon from previous Half-Life games, was omitted as Valve could not make melee combat work in VR, and because players would accidentally catch it on objects in the game world as they moved, creating confusion. Additionally, players associated the crowbar with Gordon Freeman, the protagonist of previous games. Valve wanted to create a different identity for Alyx, portraying her as a "hacker and tinkerer". Other discarded weapon concepts include a trip mine, slingshot, shield, and rocket launcher.

As players move at more realistic speeds in VR compared to typical FPS games, Valve had to adjust enemies to make combat fair and fun. Antlions, returning enemies from Half-Life 2, would quickly overwhelm players; the team slowed their movement and added the ability to shoot their legs off to slow them down. Fast zombies and fast headcrabs, also introduced in Half-Life 2, were cut as they were too frightening for some players in VR. According to the designer Dario Casali, "The shock of having [fast headcrabs] come around the corner and latch onto you before you'd even know what was going on was just too much."

Casting 
Merle Dandridge reprised her role as Alyx for initial recording sessions in March 2019, but after playtests indicated that Alyx needed a younger voice, Ozioma Akagha was cast in September 2019. Akagha avoided using irritation in her performance, as "you don't want someone in your head that sounds irritated with you".

Additional actors include James Moses Black as Eli, replacing Robert Guillaume, who died in 2017, and Rhys Darby as Russell, who added comedic elements. Returning actors include Tony Todd as the alien Vortigaunts, Mike Shapiro as the G-Man, and Ellen McLain as the voice of the Combine broadcasts. Shapiro recorded his lines in one 20-minute take, with pickups in 2019. Cissy Jones (Olga) and Rich Sommer (Larry, Russell's Drone, and Combine Soldiers) were cast at the suggestion of writer Sean Vanaman, who had worked with them on Campo Santo's Firewatch (2016).

Writing 

The former Valve writers Erik Wolpaw and Jay Pinkerton turned down invitations to return to Valve early in the Alyx development. Instead, Valve recruited Rob Yescombe of The Invisible Hours, who worked on Alyx in 2017 and 2018. Yescombe's narrative was darker than other Half-Life games, with scenes of dread, torture and horror. The antagonist was a female Combine officer named Hahn; in one proposed ending, Alyx would kill Hahn in revenge for torturing her father. Yescombe also proposed an ending in which Alyx and the G-Man would travel back in time to the events of the first Half-Life to prevent Freeman from triggering the alien invasion.

After the company-wide playtest in 2018, feedback was overwhelmingly positive but for the story, which employees scored the lowest of any Valve game. Morasky described it as "dark, serious and laborious", likening it to a Zack Snyder superhero film. Designer Corey Peters said the team had a "strong feeling" about the story and that it had been "validating" to get the feedback.

Valve initially planned to launch Alyx alongside its Index VR headset in June 2019, but delayed it to address the story. They re-enlisted Wolpaw and Pinkerton to rewrite the plot and dialogue from scratch while preserving the gameplay. They were joined by Jake Rodkin and Sean Vanaman, who had joined the company when Valve acquired Campo Santo. Sources reported that Marc Laidlaw, who retired from Valve in 2016, provided consultation. However, he later denied this, saying he did not want the writers "second-guessing him" and that he had confidence in Pinkerton and Wolpaw.

The new writers identified three problems. First, the nature of a prequel meant that players knew the characters would survive, reducing suspense. Second, the story did not have an impact on the overall Half-Life story; the writers did not want it to feel "just like a hermetically sealed short story in the world of Half-Life". Third, the game had to end with an encounter with G-Man, essentially a god, giving Alyx something for freeing him; the writers could not imagine what this could be. Walker said the team did not want the ending to be something "you could just ignore", and knew that fans had been in a "narrative limbo" since Episode Two, which they wanted to change.

Having Alyx and the G-Man travel forward in time and rescue Eli at the end of Episode Two was suggested by the character artist Jim Murray. The team was reluctant, as this undid the Episode Two cliffhanger, but were intrigued by the questions it raised about the world and how it pushed the Half-Life story forward. The change required Valve to create new assets, such as the Episode Two White Forest helicopter hangar and models for Dog, an older Eli, and Gordon Freeman. The red herring, wherein Alyx believes she is rescuing Gordon Freeman before discovering the G-Man, was conceived by Vanaman late in production. As there was no character model for the Combine scientist Alyx overhears, the scene was animated in shadow play.

While previous Valve games use silent protagonists, the writers found that having Alyx speak improved the storytelling. They added radio dialog between Alyx and Russell as a simple way to "bring the energy up" whenever needed. The final script ran to 280 pages, compared to 128 pages for Half-Life 2 and 18 for Half-Life.

Release 
Valve announced Half-Life: Alyx in November 2019. Valve waited until the game was almost complete before announcing it, aiming to avoid the delays of previous games. They were conscious that players, having waited years for a new Half-Life game, might be disappointed by a VR game, and tightly managed the announcement. To promote Alyx, Valve made the prior Half-Life games free on Steam from January 2020 until its release. Valve was due to showcase Alyx at the 2019 Game Awards that December, but canceled hours prior, saying they were "hard at work on the game".

Alyx was free to owners of Valve Index headsets or controllers. Alyx was released on March 23, 2020. Valve released a Linux version on May 15, 2020, along with Vulkan rendering support for both platforms. A pre-release build was mistakenly released on Steam; it included non-VR developer tools, allowing interactions such as picking up objects and firing weapons. However, most of the basic interactions, such as pressing buttons or filling Alyx's backpack, could not be completed with the "use" key.

When asked about plans for future Half-Life games, the designer David Speyrer said Valve was willing but were waiting for the reaction to Alyx. According to Walker, "We absolutely see Half-Life: Alyx as our return to this world, not the end of it." Mod support tools for the Source 2 engine and Steam Workshop support for Half-Life: Alyx were released on May 15, 2020. Valve announced plans to release a new Hammer level editor for Source 2. They planned to release a partial Source 2 software development kit for the updated features at a later date, with the focus at launch on shipping and supporting Alyx.

Reception 

Half-Life: Alyx received "universal acclaim", according to review aggregator Metacritic. By April 2020, it was one of the 20 highest-rated PC games on Metacritic. Reviewers at publications such as VG247, Tom's Hardware, and Video Games Chronicle described it as VR's "killer app".

The announcement trailer was watched over 10 million times within the first 24 hours of its release. Though most fans expressed excitement, some were disappointed that the game was only available in VR, a small but growing market in 2019. Before the game's release, Vic Hood of TechRadar expressed enthusiasm for Alyx, but wrote that "we forever live in hope for a Half-Life 3".

Kevin Webb of Business Insider wrote that Alyx could "spark fresh interest in an industry [VR] that has struggled to win over hardcore gamers". Andrew King of USGamer also suggested that Alyx would be the "make or break VR Jesus Moment" for the modding community, in whether the players would be interested and be capable of using the tools provided by Valve to produce new creations that took advantage of VR space, as modification within VR space had traditionally been difficult to work with prior to this point. Alyx also won the Easy Allies 2020 awards for both Best World Design and Game of the Year. 

In Polygon, Ben Kuchera wrote of how Alyx used VR to transform traditional FPS systems; for example, he felt that reloading guns, traditionally done with a single button press, was more fun in VR. He wrote: "The magic lies in being inside the world, being able to touch it, and interact with it, directly. The game’s design and pacing would lose all meaning if played as a standard game, even if more players would be able to experience the story for its own sake."

Sales
Valve's Greg Coomer said Valve knew many people would not play the game on launch, and that its audience was "relatively small right now". Newell described it as a "forward investment" into long-term technologies. In 2021, PCGamesN wrote that though it was "artfully crafted", Alyx had had "all the cultural impact of a Michael Bublé album".

The Valve Index headset, controllers, and base stations all sold out in the United States, Canada, and Europe within a week of the game's announcement. By mid-January 2020, they were sold out in all 31 regions the units were offered. According to Superdata, Valve sold 103,000 Index units in the fourth quarter of 2019 as a result of the Alyx announcements, compared to the total 149,000 sold throughout 2019, and it was the highest-selling VR headset for PCs during that quarter. Though Valve had expected to supply several Index pre-orders in time for the release of Alyx, the COVID-19 pandemic limited their supply chain.

Awards 
Half-Life: Alyx won "Game of the Year" at the 2020 VR Awards. At The Game Awards 2020, it was nominated for "Best Game Direction", "Best Audio Design", and "Best Action", and won for "Best VR/AR" game. At the 17th British Academy Games Awards, it was nominated for "Best Game", "Game Direction", "Audio Achievement", and "Artistic Achievement".

References

External links 
 

2020 video games
Alien invasions in video games
Dystopian video games
The Game Awards winners
Game Developers Choice Award winners
Half-Life (series)
HTC Vive games
Interactive Achievement Award winners
Interquel video games
Linux games
Oculus Rift games
Fiction about rebellions
Single-player video games
Source 2 games
Valve Index games
Video games about zombies
Video games developed in the United States
Video games featuring black protagonists
Video games featuring female protagonists
Video games scored by Mike Morasky
Video games set in Eastern Europe
Video games with commentaries
Video games with Steam Workshop support
Video games with user-generated gameplay content
Virtual reality games
Windows games